The following is a list of notable deaths in April 2022.

Entries for each day are listed alphabetically by surname. A typical entry lists information in the following sequence:
 Name, age, country of citizenship at birth, subsequent country of citizenship (if applicable), reason for notability, cause of death (if known), and reference.

April 2022

1
Andrei Babitsky, 57, Russian journalist (RFE/RL), cardiac arrest.
Delfina Entrecanales, 94, Spanish arts philanthropist.
Alberto Estella Goytre, 81, Spanish politician, deputy (1977–1982).
Ryszard Frąckiewicz, 90, Polish diplomat, ambassador to Australia (1978–1983) and Japan (1986–1991).
Addagatla Chinna Innayya, 84, Indian Roman Catholic prelate, bishop of Nalgonda (1989–1993) and Srikakulam (1993–2018).
Petre Ivănescu, 85, Romanian handball player (Dinamo București, national team) and coach (TUSEM Essen).
Maks Levin, 40, Ukrainian photojournalist (Reuters, BBC), shot. (body discovered on this date) 
Jolanta Lothe, 79, Polish actress (Hunting Flies, The Cruise, The Deluge).
C. W. McCall, 93, American country singer ("Convoy", "'Round the World with the Rubber Duck", "Roses for Mama") and politician, mayor of Ouray, Colorado (1986–1992), lung cancer.
Mario Mettbach, 69, German politician, second mayor of Hamburg (2003–2004) and Hamburg MP (2001–2004). (death announced on this date)
Munesuke Mita, 84, Japanese sociologist, sepsis.
Eleanor Munro, 94, American art critic, art historian, and writer.
Red Óg Murphy, 21, Irish footballer (DCU GAA, North Melbourne).
Meena Parande, 91, Indian table tennis player.
Nina Pereverzeva, 93, Russian politician, member of the CCCP (1982–1990).
Daphne Pirie, 90, Australian athlete and sports administrator.
Yuriy Ruf, 41, Ukrainian poet and writer. 
Neil Stevens, 74, Canadian Hall of Fame sportswriter (The Canadian Press), cancer.
Jack Trickey, 87, Australian Olympic cyclist (1956).
Dejo Tunfulu, 49, Nigerian comedian, actor, and writer.
Jerrold B. Tunnell, 71, American mathematician (Tunnell's theorem), traffic collision.
Roland White, 83, American bluegrass guitarist, complications of a heart attack.
Eleanor Whittemore, 95, American politician, member of the New Hampshire House of Representatives (1983–1985).
Gerhard J. Woeginger, 57, Austrian mathematician.
Aleksandra Yakovleva, 64, Russian actress (Air Crew, Charodei, A Man from the Boulevard des Capucines), breast cancer.
Zou Yan, 106, Chinese military officer.

2
Vance Amory, 72, Saint Kitts and Nevis politician and cricketer (Leeward Islands, Combined Islands), premier of Nevis (1992–2006, 2013–2017).
Sergio Chejfec, 65, Argentine writer.
Joseph A. Diclerico Jr., 81, American jurist, judge (since 1992) and chief judge (1992–1997) for the U.S. District Court for New Hampshire.
Paulo França, 70, Brazilian politician, Santa Catarina MLA (2011–2015), cancer.
Oswaldo Frossasco, 69, Argentine Olympic cyclist (1976).
Sir Robin Gray, 90, New Zealand politician, MP (1978–1996), speaker of the House of Representatives (1990–1993).
Estelle Harris, 93, American actress (Seinfeld, Toy Story, The Suite Life of Zack & Cody).
Rex Harris, 82, British academic.
Victor Hettigoda, 84, Sri Lankan businessman.
Javier Imbroda, 61, Spanish basketball coach and politician, member of the Andalusian parliament (since 2018) and regional minister of education and sports (since 2019), prostate cancer.
Mantas Kvedaravičius, 45, Lithuanian film director, shot.
Silvio Longobucco, 70, Italian footballer (Ternana, Juventus, Cagliari).
Mirjana Majurec, 69, Croatian actress (The Rat Savior, King's Endgame, Below the Line).
Mıgırdiç Margosyan, 83, Turkish writer.
Henrich Mayorov, 85, Russian-Ukrainian choreographer and ballet dancer.
Leonel Sánchez, 85, Chilean football player (Universidad de Chile, Colo-Colo, national team) and manager, pulmonary fibrosis.
Gerald Schreck, 83, American sailor, Olympic champion (1968).
Olga Sukhenko, 51, Ukrainian politician, village head of Motyzhyn, shot. (death announced on this date)

3
Ave Alavainu, 79, Estonian poet and writer.
Yamina Bachir, 68, Algerian film director (Rachida) and screenwriter (Sandstorm).
Noeline Brokenshire, 96, New Zealand cricketer (Canterbury), field hockey player (national team) and British Empire Games sprinter (1950).
June Brown, 95, English actress (EastEnders, The Duchess of Duke Street, Bean) and writer.
Gerald Coates, 77, English evangelist.
Christopher Coover, 72, American antique books appraiser, pneumonia complicated by Parkinson's disease.
Tommy Davis, 83, American baseball player (Los Angeles Dodgers, Baltimore Orioles, Oakland Athletics) and coach, World Series champion (1963).
Archie Eversole, 37, German-born American rapper, shot.
Lygia Fagundes Telles, 98, Brazilian writer, member of the Brazilian Academy of Letters.
Derrick Goodwin, 86, English theatre and television director (Holding the Fort, Dear Mother...Love Albert), producer (On the Buses), and writer. (death announced on this date)
Heikki Hedman, 81, Finnish tennis player.
William S. Horne, 85, American politician, member of the Maryland House of Delegates (1973–1989).
Jin Di, 89, Chinese actress (The Wedding Maidens), television director and screenwriter.
Bruce Johnson, 71, American news anchor and reporter (WUSA), heart attack.
Werner Klatt, 73, German rower, Olympic champion (1976).
Gerda Weissmann Klein, 97, Polish-American writer and human rights activist.
David G. Mason, 79, American politician, member of the Kentucky House of Representatives (1974–1977).
Michael Meier, 93, German Roman Catholic prelate, coadjutor archbishop (1984–1987) and archbishop (1987–2006) of Mount Hagen.
Donn B. Murphy, 91, American theatre and speech teacher (Georgetown University) and theatrical advisor.
Snežana Nikšić, 78, Serbian actress (Siberian Lady Macbeth, The Tiger, Bolji život).
Einar Østby, 86, Norwegian cross-country skier, Olympic silver medallist (1960).
Stan Parrish, 75, American football coach (Tampa Bay Buccaneers, Ball State Cardinals, Michigan Wolverines), cancer.
Frances Porter, 96, New Zealand writer and historian.
Pamela Rooke, 66, British model and actress, bile duct cancer.
Betty Rowland, 106, American burlesque dancer.
Desmond Seward, 86, British historian.
Gene Shue, 90, American basketball player (Fort Wayne/Detroit Pistons, New York Knicks) and coach (Baltimore/Washington Bullets), melanoma.
Willie Tasby, 89, American baseball player (Baltimore Orioles, Washington Senators, Cleveland Indians).
Kainakary Thankaraj, 75, Indian actor (Amen, Ee.Ma.Yau., Home).
James Webster, 96, Australian politician, senator (1964–1980), minister for science (1975–1979).
Andrzej Wiśniewski, 66, Polish football coach (Wisła Płock, Palestine, Polonia Warsaw), heart attack.

4
Bob Babich, 74, American football player (Cleveland Browns, San Diego Chargers).
Donald Baechler, 65, American painter and sculptor, heart attack.
Eric Boehlert, 57, American media critic and writer (Salon, Rolling Stone, Billboard), hit by train.
Madeline Cain, 72, American politician, member of the Ohio House of Representatives (1989–1995) and mayor of Lakewood, Ohio (1996–2003).
José Geraldo da Cruz, 80, Brazilian Roman Catholic prelate, bishop of Juazeiro (2003–2016).
Karine Danielyan, 74, Armenian politician, minister of nature and environment protection (1991–1994).
Margo Feiden, 77, American art gallery owner, complications from a fall.
Maya Govind, 82, Indian lyricist, heart attack.
Julian J. Hook, 80, American politician, member of the Minnesota House of Representatives (1971–1974).
Little Karim, 71, Pakistani mountaineer, liver cancer.
Friedrich-Wilhelm Kiel, 87, German politician, member of the Landtag of Baden-Württemberg (1992–2001), mayor of Ettlingen (1966–1970) and Fellbach (1976–2000).
Kathy Lamkin, 74, American actress (No Country for Old Men, The Texas Chainsaw Massacre, The Astronaut Farmer).
Li Suwen, 88, Chinese politician, vice chairperson of the Standing Committee of the NPC (1975–1978).
John McNally, 89, Irish boxer, Olympic silver medallist (1952).
Joe Messina, 93, American Hall of Fame guitarist (The Funk Brothers).
Norio Niikawa, 79, Japanese physician and medical geneticist, discoverer of Kabuki syndrome.
Boris Powell, 57, American boxer, amyotrophic lateral sclerosis.
Raziel, 49, Mexican professional wrestler (CMLL).
Jim Reilly, 77, American politician, member of the Illinois House of Representatives (1977–1983).
Vernon Scoville, 68, American politician, member of the Missouri House of Representatives (1983–1991).
Django Sissoko, 74, Malian civil servant, acting prime minister (2012–2013) and minister of justice (1984–1988).
Petar Skansi, 78, Croatian basketball player (Jugoplastika, Yugoslavia national team) and coach (Benetton Treviso), Olympic silver medalist (1968).
Branislav Šoškić, 99, Montenegrin politician, president of the Socialist Republic of Montenegro (1985–1986).
Herb Turetzky, 76, American basketball official scorer (Brooklyn Nets), primary lateral sclerosis.
Jerry Uelsmann, 87, American photographer.
Joseph P. Wyatt Jr., 80, American politician, member of the U.S. House of Representatives (1979–1981) and the Texas House of Representatives (1971–1979).
Juan Francisco Zanassi, 75, Argentine Olympic rower (1964).
Andrzej Zygmunt, 76, Polish footballer (national team).

5
Sidney Altman, 82, Canadian-American molecular biologist, Nobel Prize laureate (1989).
Harry Billinge, 96, British World War II veteran and fundraiser.
Boris Brott, 78, Canadian conductor, traffic collision. 
Joaquim Carvalho, 84, Portuguese footballer (Sporting CP, Atlético, national team).
John Cumberland, 74, American baseball player (New York Yankees, San Francisco Giants, St. Louis Cardinals).
John Ellis, 73, American baseball player (New York Yankees, Cleveland Indians, Texas Rangers), cancer.
Graciela Giannettasio, 71, Argentine politician, deputy (2007–2015) and minister of education (2002–2003).
David Keyte, 67–68, English businessman and football club chairman, liver cancer.
David Kilgour, 81, Canadian politician, MP (1979–2006), lung disease.
Stanisław Kowalski, 111, Polish masters athlete, nation's oldest living man (since 2018).
Josef Panáček, 84, Czech sport shooter, Olympic champion (1976).
Nehemiah Persoff, 102, American actor (Some Like It Hot, An American Tail, Yentl), heart failure.
Boris Powell, 57, American boxer, complications from amyotrophic lateral sclerosis.
Edward Rayner, 89, English footballer (Northwich Victoria, Stoke City, Macclesfield Town).
Lee Rose, 85, American basketball coach (Charlotte 49ers, Purdue Boilermakers, South Florida Bulls) and athletic administrator.
Bobby Rydell, 79, American singer ("Wild One", "Wildwood Days") and actor (Bye Bye Birdie), pneumonia.
Bill Sadler, 90, Canadian racecar and aircraft designer.
Yoshikazu Shirakawa, 87, Japanese photographer, stroke.
Paul Siebel, 84, American singer-songwriter. 
Yefrem Sokolov, 95, Belarusian politician, first secretary of the Communist Party (1987–1990). 
Doug Sutherland, 73, American football player (Minnesota Vikings, Seattle Seahawks).
Bjarni Tryggvason, 76, Icelandic-born Canadian astronaut (STS-85).
Eelco Visser, 55, Dutch computer scientist.
*Jimmy Wang Yu, 79, Taiwanese actor (Golden Swallow, One-Armed Swordsman, The Chinese Boxer).
Leslie Young, 72, Chinese-born New Zealand economist.

6
Rae Allen, 95, American actress (And Miss Reardon Drinks A Little, A League of Their Own, The Sopranos), Tony winner (1971).
Dolores Álvarez Campillo, 61, Spanish politician, member of the General Junta of the Principality of Asturias (2015–2019), cancer.
Drew Christiansen, 77, American Jesuit priest.
Mark Conover, 61, American Olympic runner (1988), cancer.
John Creighton, 85, New Zealand rugby union player (Canterbury, national team).
Reinhilde Decleir, 73, Belgian actress  (Doctor Vlimmen, Whitey, Love Belongs to Everyone), euthanasia.
Ana Derșidan-Ene-Pascu, 77, Romanian fencer, Olympic bronze medallist (1968, 1972).
Karol Divín, 86, Hungarian-born Slovak figure skater, Olympic silver medallist (1960).
Helen Golden, 81, Dutch singer.
Melvin Hulse, 74, Belizean politician, colon cancer.
Jill Knight, 98, British politician, MP (1966–1997), member of the House of Lords (1997–2016).
Nicole Maestracci, 71, French lawyer, member of the Constitutional Council (2013–2022).
Emiliano Mascetti, 79, Italian football player (Hellas Verona, Como, Torino) and manager.
David McKee, 87, British writer and illustrator (Mr Benn, Elmer the Patchwork Elephant, Not Now, Bernard).
Georg Neuber, 96, German Olympic fencer (1960).
Karl Neuse, 91, German Olympic water polo player (1956).
John van de Rest, 82, Dutch film director and screenwriter.
Domingo Romera, 85, Spanish politician and captain, senator (1984–1986), MEP (1986–1994).
Camilla Salvago Raggi, 98, Italian poet and novelist.
Horst Schröder, 84, German politician, MP (1972–1984).
Annie Servais-Thysen, 88, Belgian politician, member of the Walloon parliament (1995–2004).
Abraham Sie, 22, Ivorian basketball player (ABC Fighters, DUC Dakar, national team).
Tom Smith, 50, Scottish rugby union player (Northampton Saints, national team, British & Irish Lions), colorectal cancer.
Tadao Takahashi, 71, Brazilian Hall of Fame computer scientist, heart attack.
Mikhail Vasenkov, 79, Russian spy (Illegals Program).
Wen Hsia, 93, Taiwanese singer and actor, organ failure.
Yu Guocong, 99, Chinese engineer, member of the Chinese Academy of Sciences.
Vladimir Zhirinovsky, 75, Russian politician, MP (since 1993), COVID-19.
Gerd Zimmermann, 72, German footballer (Fortuna Düsseldorf, Houston Hurricane, Calgary Boomers).

7
Garibaldi Alves, 98, Brazilian politician, senator (2011–2014) and Rio Grande do Norte MLA (1957–1969).
Christopher Ball, 85, British composer.
Carlos Barrera Sánchez, 71, Spanish politician, síndic d'Aran (1995–2007, 2015–2019).
Shamsha Berkimbayeva, 79, Kazakh academic and politician, minister of education and science (2002–2003).
Dušan Čkrebić, 94, Serbian politician, prime minister (1974–1978) and president (1984–1986).
Elias Davidsson, 81, Icelandic composer and conspiracy theorist.
Ludwik Dorn, 67, Polish politician, MP (1997–2015), deputy prime minister and minister of interior and administration (2005–2007).
Mercè Durfort i Coll, 78, Spanish biologist and professor, member of Institute for Catalan Studies (since 1989).
Miguel Ángel Estrella, 81, Argentine pianist, ambassador to UNESCO (2003–2015) and member of the Russell Tribunal.
Bernard Fisher, 88, English footballer (Hull City, Bradford City).
Fujiko A. Fujio, 88, Japanese manga artist (Ninja Hattori-kun, The Monster Kid, The Laughing Salesman).
Mary Green, 78, British Olympic sprinter (1968).
John Jobling, 84, Australian politician, New South Wales MLC (1984–2003).
Robert Kharshiing, 63, Indian politician, MP (2002–2008).
Kim Yong-Bock, 83–84, South Korean theologian, colorectal cancer.
Ramatu Aliu Mahama, 70, Ghanaian educationist, Second Lady of Ghana (2001–2009)
Pedro Marchetta, 79, Argentine football player (Racing Club, Santiago Morning) and coach (Belgrano).
Hellmuth Matiasek, 90, Austrian theatre director, theatre manager (Theater am Gärtnerplatz), and drama school president (Bayerische Theaterakademie August Everding).
BM Nazrul Islam, 75, Bangladeshi politician, MP (1999–2001).
Michael Neidorff, 79, American business executive, CEO of Centene Corporation (since 1996).
Birgit Nordin, 88, Swedish opera singer.
Elvis Nyathi, 43, Zimbabwean refugee, beaten and burned.
Emmanuel Portacio, 52, Filipino lawn bowler.
Jürgen Reents, 72, German journalist and politician, deputy (1983–1985).
Hiro Sachiya, 85, Japanese religious scholar, liver cancer.
Carlos Salazar, 90, Filipino actor.
Man Sasaki, 95, Japanese politician, councillor (1976–1998).
Arliss Sturgulewski, 94, American politician, member of the Alaska Senate (1979–1993).
Hana Truncová, 97, Czech political prisoner.
Ken West, 64, Australian music promoter, founder of Big Day Out.
Rayfield Wright, 76, American Hall of Fame football player (Dallas Cowboys), Super Bowl champion (VI, XII).

8
Psalm Adjeteyfio, 55, Ghanaian actor (A Stab in the Dark), complications from heart failure.
Emily Akuffo, 88, Ghanaian teacher, first lady (1978–1979).
Carl Boles, 87, American baseball player (San Francisco Giants).
Massimo Cristaldi, 66, Italian film producer (Our Italian Husband, Sicilian Ghost Story).
Henri Depireux, 78, Belgian football player (Standard Liège, national team) and manager (Bellinzona).
Stelio Fenzo, 89, Italian cartoonist.
Bob Gray, 98, English footballer (Gateshead).
Edwin Kantar, 89, American bridge player, world champion (1977, 1979).
Barak Lufan, 35, Israeli sprint kayaker and Paralympic coach, shot.
Minori Matsushima, 81, Japanese actress, voice actress, and narrator (Candy Candy, Dororo, Mazinger Z), pancreatic cancer.
Osinachi Nwachukwu, 42, Nigerian gospel singer, blood clot.
Chibuzor Nwakanma, 57, Nigerian footballer (Mohun Bagan AC, SC East Bengal, Mohammedan SC), cardiac arrest.
Peng Ming-min, 98, Taiwanese independence activist.
Liza Picard, 94, English lawyer and historian.
Hudarni Rani, 71, Indonesian politician, senator (since 2014) and governor of Bangka Belitung Islands (2002–2007).
Mimi Reinhardt, 107, Austrian secretary (Oskar Schindler).
József Salim, 54, Hungarian Olympic taekwondo practitioner (1992, 2000). (death announced on this date)
John Shy, 91, American military historian.
Nagai Sriram, 41, Indian Carnatic violinist.
José Vilariño, 60, Argentine politician, deputy (1995–1999, 2003–2015), cardiac arrest.
Alexander Vovin, 61, Russian-American Japanologist.

9
Stephen Athipozhiyil, 77, Indian Roman Catholic prelate, coadjutor bishop (2000–2001) and bishop (2001–2019) of Alleppey.
Chris Bailey, 65, Kenyan-born Australian musician (The Saints) and songwriter ("(I'm) Stranded", "Just Like Fire Would").
M. Balayya, 92, Indian actor (Chivaraku Migiledi, Irugu Porugu, Bobbili Yuddham), writer and film producer.
Tom Bleick, 79, American football player (Baltimore Colts, Atlanta Falcons).
Uwe Bohm, 60, German actor (Moritz, Dear Moritz, Yasemin, Herzlich willkommen).
Brian Booth, 97, Australian cricketer (Tasmania).
Jim Bronstad, 85, American baseball player (Washington Senators, New York Yankees).
Riccardo Dalisi, 90, Italian architect and designer.
Ihor Dashko, 44, Ukrainian military officer, suicide.
Michael Degen, 90, German-Israeli actor (Supermarket, Beyond Good and Evil, Dr. M).
Michel Delebarre, 75, French politician, mayor of Dunkirk (1989–2014) and senator (2011–2017).
Lellos Demetriades, 89, Cypriot politician, mayor of Nicosia Municipality (1971–2001) and deputy (1960–1970).
Inga Freidenfelds, 86, Latvian-born Australian Olympic basketball player (1956).
Chiara Frugoni, 82, Italian historian.
Trevor Harrop, 94, Canadian-born British Olympic swimmer (1948).
Dwayne Haskins, 24, American football player (Washington Redskins/Football Team, Pittsburgh Steelers), traffic collision.
Jack Higgins, 92, British author (The Eagle Has Landed, Thunder Point, Angel of Death).
Ann Hutchinson Guest, 103, American dance notator.
Myra Larcombe, 94, New Zealand swimming coach.
Pat Newman, 82, American tennis coach.
Lawrence Poitras, 91, Canadian jurist, chief justice of the Superior Court of Quebec (1992–1996).
Dick Swatland, 76, American football player (Houston Oilers, Bridgeport Jets).
Allan Trusler, 88, Australian footballer (Footscray).
Brian Winston, 80, British journalist.
Jeremy Young, 86–87, British actor (Doctor Who, Coronation Street, Crooks and Coronets).

10
John Arguelles, 94, American jurist, associate justice of the Supreme Court of California (1987–1989).
Gary Barrett, 82, American ecologist.
Philippe Boesmans, 85, Belgian composer.
Desmond Brathwaite, Saint Lucian politician, MP (1987–1997).
Gary Brown, 52, American football player (Houston Oilers, New York Giants, San Diego Chargers) and coach, cancer.
Jon Herwig Carlsen, 84, Norwegian sports commentator (NRK).
John Drew, 67, American basketball player (Atlanta Hawks, Utah Jazz), bone cancer.
Francis Geng, 90, French politician, deputy (1978–1993).
Eya Guezguez, 17, Tunisian Olympic sailor (2020), drowned.
Joe Horlen, 84, American baseball player (Chicago White Sox, Oakland Athletics), World Series champion (1972).
M. C. Josephine, 74, Indian politician, chairperson of the Kerala Women's Commission (2017–2021), heart attack.
Kalindi, 28, Brazilian footballer (Penafiel, Nacional).
Hazem Nuseibeh, 99, Jordanian politician, minister of foreign affairs (1962–1965).
Estela Rodríguez, 54, Cuban judoka, Olympic silver medallist (1992, 1996), cardiac arrest.
Jos Schreurs, 87, Dutch Roman Catholic priest and politician, senator (1980–1981).
Alexander Shkurko, 84, Russian historian, president of the State Historical Museum (1992–2010).
Shiv Kumar Subramaniam, Indian actor (Mukti Bandhan) and screenwriter (Parinda, Hazaaron Khwaishein Aisi).
Wang Senhao, 89, Chinese engineer and politician, governor of Shanxi (1983–1992).
Desai Williams, 62, Canadian sprinter, Olympic bronze medalist (1984), heart attack.

11
Oleksandr Bakumenko, 62, Ukrainian politician, people's deputy (2014–2019).
John D. Bransford, 78, American psychologist and educational theorist, lewy body dementia.
Gary Bullock, 80, American actor (Twin Peaks: Fire Walk with Me, RoboCop 2, Species).
Garrett Burnett, 46, Canadian ice hockey player (Mighty Ducks of Anaheim).
Calvi, 83, French cartoonist, caricaturist and illustrator.
Wayne Cooper, 65, American basketball player (Portland Trail Blazers, Denver Nuggets, Golden State Warriors), complications from kidney disease.
Ihor Dybchenko, 61, Ukrainian footballer (Shakhtar Donetsk, Shakhtar Horlivka, Pivdenstal Yenakiieve).
*Mohammad Feyz Sarabi, 93, Iranian Islamic cleric and politician, member of the Assembly of Experts (since 2006).
Gábor Görgey, 92, Hungarian writer and poet, minister of culture (2002–2003).
Eduardo Guardia, 56, Brazilian economist and politician, minister of finance (2018–2019).
Mohammad Hussain, 45, Pakistani cricketer (national team).
Hans Junkermann, 87, German racing cyclist.
Aleksandr Kuzmin, 80, Russian diplomat, ambassador to Sudan (1992–1998).
Bill Ludwig, 87, Australian trade unionist.
Joseph Makoju, 73, Nigerian engineer.
Charnett Moffett, 54, American jazz bassist, heart attack.
René Mornex, 94, French endocrinologist and academic.
Chip Myrtle, 76, American football player (Denver Broncos).
Timothy R. Parsons, 89, Canadian oceanographer.
Claude Véga, 91, French impersonator, humorist and actor.

12
Rogerio Azcárraga Madero, 94, Mexican businessman.
Sonny Caldinez, 89, Trinidadian actor (Doctor Who, The Fifth Element, Raiders of the Lost Ark).
Sir Gordon Downey, 93, British public servant, parliamentary commissioner for standards (1995–1998).
Olga Fiorini, 95, Italian businesswoman and educator.
Gilbert Gottfried, 67, American comedian, television personality (Hollywood Squares), and actor (Aladdin, Cyberchase), ventricular tachycardia.
Zvonimir Janko, 89, Croatian mathematician (Janko groups).
Giorgos Katiforis, 87, Greek lawyer and academic, MEP (1994–2004).
Larysa Khorolets, 73, Ukrainian actress, minister of culture (1991–1992).
Charles McCormick, 75, American musician (Bloodstone).
Cedric McMillan, 44, American bodybuilder, heart attack.
Doris Honig Merritt, 98, American physician.
M. P. Govindan Nair, 94, Indian politician, Kerala MLA (1960–1964).
Charles P. Roland, 104, American historian.
Shirley Spork, 94, American professional golfer, co-founder of the LPGA.
Traian Stănescu, 82, Romanian actor (Răscoala, Trandafirul galben, The Silver Mask).
Irina Vorobieva, 63, Russian Olympic figure skater (1976).
Sergei Yashin, 60, Russian ice hockey player (Dynamo Moscow, EHC Dynamo Berlin, HC Davos), Olympic champion (1988).
Arne Zwaig, 75, Norwegian chess player.

13
Letizia Battaglia, 87, Italian photographer.
Michel Bouquet, 96, French actor (The Unfaithful Wife, The Bride Wore Black, Toto the Hero).
Jorge Carreño Luengas, 92–93, Colombian judge, president of the Supreme Court (1990–1991).
Johanna Ekström, 51, Swedish author and artist, cancer.
Wolfgang Fahrian, 80, German footballer (Hertha BSC, Fortuna Köln, West Germany national team).
Alex Gilady, 79, Israeli sports journalist and Olympic official, cancer.
Francesco Glorioso, 79, Italian Olympic rower (1964).
Josef Göppel, 71, German politician, MP (2002–2017).
Laura Harris Hales, 54, American writer, historian, and podcaster, pancreatic cancer.
Hua Wenyi, 81, Chinese Kunqu performer.
Jimmy Leonard, 94, Irish politician, senator (1981–1982) and three-term TD.
Maurice Lévy, 99, French physicist and teacher, president of the CNES (1973–1976).
Lillian M. Lowery, 67–68, American school superintendent.
David Luteijn, 78, Dutch politician, senator (1983–1995).
Tom McCarthy, 61, Canadian ice hockey player (Minnesota North Stars, Boston Bruins) and coach, complications from heart surgery.
Bill Nation, 96, American politician, member of the Wyoming House of Representatives (1965–1967) and mayor of Cheyenne, Wyoming (1962–1966, 1973–1977).
Bob Neuenschwander, 73, American politician, member of the Minnesota House of Representatives (1983–1990).
Gloria Parker, 100, American musician and bandleader.
Freddy Rincón, 55, Colombian footballer (Corinthians, Real Madrid, national team), head injuries from traffic collision.
Thomas Rosenlöcher, 74, German writer and poet.
Vincent Ryan, 83, Australian Catholic priest and convicted sex offender.
Colin Semper, 84, English Anglican priest.
Jorge Trías, 73, Spanish lawyer, politician and whistleblower (Bárcenas affair), deputy (1996–2000), complications from COVID-19.
Alvin Walker, 67, American football player (Ottawa Rough Riders, Montreal Alouettes), cancer.
Wang Yumei, 87, Chinese actress (Wreaths at the Foot of the Mountain, The Wooden Man's Bride, Justice Bao).

14
Roberto Bendini, 76, Argentine military officer, chief of the general staff of the Army (2003–2008), pancreatic cancer.
Alex Brenninkmeijer, 70, Dutch lawyer and academic, national ombudsman (2005–2014), member of the European Court of Auditors (since 2014).
Dennis Byars, 81, American politician, member of the Nebraska Legislature (1988–1995, 1999–2007).
Irving Davidson, 92, Australian footballer (St Kilda).
Gurbax Singh Frank, 86, Indian translator.
Rio Hackford, 51, American actor (Treme, Jonah Hex, The Mandalorian), uveal melanoma.
Chic Henry, 75, Australian car show organizer (Summernats), cancer.
Ed Jasper, 49, American football player (Atlanta Falcons, Philadelphia Eagles, Oakland Raiders).
Orlando Julius, 79, Nigerian saxophonist, singer and bandleader.
Ilkka Kanerva, 74, Finnish politician, MP (since 1975), minister of labour (1991–1995), and deputy prime minister (1991).
Cecily Littleton, 95, British crystallographer and horticulturalist, cardiac and respiratory arrest.
Mak Ho Wai, 76, Hong Kong actor (The Romancing Star II, Faithfully Yours, The Banquet).
Jack Newton, 72, Australian golfer.
Kōji Omi, 89, Japanese politician, minister of finance (2006–2007).
Joseph Pathalil, 85, Indian Roman Catholic prelate, bishop of Udaipur (1984–2012).
Clay Reynolds, 72, American writer and literary critic, pancreatic cancer.
Edward Morgan Rowell, 90, American diplomat, bullous pemphigoid.
Manju Singh, 73, Indian television producer, heart attack.
Con Sullivan, 93, English footballer (Bristol City, Arsenal).
Trygve Thue, 71, Norwegian guitarist.

15
David G. Barber, 61, Canadian environmental scientist and academic.
Mike Bossy, 65, Canadian Hall of Fame ice hockey player (New York Islanders), four-time Stanley Cup champion, lung cancer.
Tony Brown, 86, Australian rugby league player (Newtown, Penrith, national team).
Baidyanath Chakrabarty, 94, Indian gynaecologist and reproductive medicine researcher.
Bob Chinn, 99, American restaurateur.
Andy Coen, 57, American college football coach (Lehigh Mountain Hawks).
Newton Cruz, 97, Brazilian military officer.
Earl Devaney, 74, American law enforcement officer, inspector-general of the interior department (1999–2011).
Bilquis Edhi, 74, Pakistani nurse and humanitarian, heart failure.
Helle Fastrup, 70, Danish actress (Temporary Release), cancer.
Jean-Paul Fitoussi, 79, French economist.
Bernhard Germeshausen, 70, German bobsledder, Olympic champion (1976, 1980).
Bob Harrison, 80, American football player (Kent State) and coach (Atlanta Falcons, Pittsburgh Steelers).
Severo Hernández, 81, Colombian Olympic cyclist (1968).
Carlos López Riaño, 81, Spanish jurist and politician, deputy (1982–1996).
Eunice Muñoz, 93, Portuguese actress (A Morgadinha dos Canaviais, Hard Times).
Michael O'Kennedy, 86, Irish politician, minister for foreign affairs (1977–1979) and finance (1979–1980), TD (1965–2002).
Henry Plumb, Baron Plumb, 97, British politician, member (1979–1999) and president (1987–1989) of the European Parliament, member of the House of Lords (1987–2017).
Vlasta Pospíšilová, 87, Czech animator and director.
Art Rupe, 104, American Hall of Fame music executive and record producer (Specialty Records). 
Liz Sheridan, 93, American actress (Seinfeld, ALF, Play the Game).
Peter Swales, 73, Welsh historian of psychoanalysis.
Kantoku Teruya, 76, Japanese politician, MP (1995–2001, 2003–2021), stomach cancer.

16
Lembit Arro, 92, Estonian judge and politician, MP (1992–1999).
J. N. Bhatt, 76, Indian jurist, justice of the Gujarat High Court (1990–2005) and chief justice of Patna High Court (2005–2007).
Bill Bourne, 68, Canadian fiddler, guitarist (Tri-Continental) and songwriter, bladder cancer.
John Dougherty, 89, American Roman Catholic prelate, auxiliary bishop of Scranton (1995–2009).
Elenore Freedman, 96, American educator, co-founder of The Derryfield School.
Vladimir Frolov, Russian military officer. (death announced on this date)
Rosario Ibarra, 95, Mexican social activist and politician, senator (2006–2012).
Rhoda Kadalie, 68, South African social activist, lung cancer.
David Leeson, 64, American photojournalist.
Mariano Ortiz, 77, Puerto Rican Olympic basketball player (1968, 1972, 1976).
Nawal Kishore Rai, 62, Indian politician, MP (1991–1997, 1999–2004).
Jon A. Reynolds, 84, American military officer.
Wendy Rieger, 65, American news anchor (WRC-TV), glioblastoma.
Gloria Sevilla, 90, Filipino actress (Bida si Mister, Bida si Misis, Once Upon a Time in Manila, Boy Golden: Shoot to Kill).
Boyet Sison, 58, Filipino sportscaster, cardiac arrest.
Joachim Streich, 71, German football player (Hansa Rostock, 1. FC Magdeburg, East Germany national team) and manager, Olympic bronze medalist (1972).
Rosella Thorne, 91, Canadian Olympic sprinter (1952).
Sir Ray Tindle, 95, British entrepreneur, founder of Tindle.
Jon Wefald, 84, American academic administrator, president of Kansas State University (1986–2009), heart attack.
Arthur Winther, 85, Australian Olympic diver (1956).
Zippy Chippy, 30, American thoroughbred racehorse.

17
Mireya Baltra, 90, Chilean journalist and politician, deputy (1969–1973) and minister of labor (1972).
Eduardo Barbeiro, 90, Portuguese Olympic swimmer (1952).
Ursula Bellugi, 91, German-born American cognitive neuroscientist.
DJ Kay Slay, 55, American disc jockey and record executive, COVID-19.
Rada Granovskaya, 92, Russian psychologist.
Jimmy Harris, 88, English footballer (Everton, Birmingham City, Oldham Athletic).
Jim Hartz, 82, American journalist and television presenter (Today), COPD.
Omer Kaleshi, 90, Macedonian painter.
Prafulla Kar, 83, Indian musician, singer, and lyricist, cardiac arrest.
William Kimbel, 68, American paleoanthropologist, cancer.
Radu Lupu, 76, Romanian pianist.
Kevin Meates, 92, New Zealand rugby union player (Canterbury, national team).
Midnight Bourbon, 4, American thoroughbred racehorse, gastrointestinal disease.
James Olson, 91, American actor (The Andromeda Strain, Commando, Rachel, Rachel).
Gilles Remiche, 43, Belgian film director and actor (The Benefit of the Doubt, Working Girls, Madly in Life), cancer.
Hollis Resnik, 67, American singer and actress (Backdraft), heart failure.
N. Sankar, 76, Indian industrialist (Sanmar Group).
Catherine Spaak, 77, Belgian-Italian actress (Kiss the Other Sheik, Il Sorpasso, Adultery Italian Style) and singer.
Rick Turner, 78, American luthier and guitarist (Autosalvage), heart failure and stroke.

18
Lidiya Alfeyeva, 76, Russian long jumper, Olympic bronze medalist (1976).
Noel Alford, 89, Australian footballer (North Melbourne).
Nicholas Angelich, 51, American classical pianist, lung disease.
Kenneth M. Baird, 99, Canadian physicist, metrologist and inventor.
Piergiorgio Bellocchio, 90, Italian literary critic and writer.
Sir Harrison Birtwistle, 87, English composer (The Triumph of Time, The Mask of Orpheus, The Minotaur).
Wilfred Cass, 97, German-born British entrepreneur and arts philanthropist.
Henry Delisle, 83, French academic and politician, deputy (1981–1986).
Jerry Doucette, 70, Canadian rock singer, songwriter and guitarist, cancer.
Valerio Evangelisti, 69, Italian novelist (Il castello di Eymerich).
Graham Fyfe, 70, Scottish footballer (Rangers, Hibernian, Dumbarton).
Bill Gatton, 89, American entrepreneur and philanthropist.
Michel Goma, 90, French fashion designer, director of Balenciaga (1987–1992).
Barbara Hall, 99, British crossword compiler and advice columnist.
Leonid Heifetz, 87, Russian stage director and drama teacher.
Andrzej Korzyński, 82, Polish composer (Man of Marble, The Birch Wood, Possession).
Sid Mark, 88, American radio presenter.
Janez Matičič, 95, Slovenian composer and pianist.
Jean Meyer, 97, French historian.
Seppo Nikkari, 74, Finnish Olympic runner (1972).
Hermann Nitsch, 83, Austrian artist (Viennese Actionism).
Pedro Pinto Rubianes, 91, Ecuadorian politician, vice president (2000–2003), minister of finance (1982–1984), MP (1998–2000).
Rein Ratas, 83, Estonian politician, MP (2007–2011, 2015–2018).
Shirō Sasaki, 83, Japanese anime and music producer, lung cancer.
Piero Scesa, 83, Italian footballer (Novara, Torino, Mantova).
Norm Suddon, 78, Scottish rugby union player (national team).
Bridget Tan, 73, Singaporean migrant workers' rights advocate, founder of the Humanitarian Organization for Migration Economics.
Thein Tun, 85, Burmese beverage executive and banker, founder of Tun Foundation Bank.
Vyacheslav Trubnikov, 77, Russian intelligence officer, director of the Foreign Intelligence Service (1996–2000).
Roger Undy, 83, British industrial relations scholar and academic.

19
Brad Ashford, 72, American politician, member of the U.S. House of Representatives (2015–2017), brain cancer.
Garland Boyette, 82, American football player (Houston Oilers, St. Louis Cardinals, Montreal Alouettes).
Robin Chan, 90, Hong Kong businessman.
Paddy Flanagan, 92, Irish Gaelic footballer (St Loman's, Westmeath) and hurler (Westmeath).
Gloria Gervitz, 79, Mexican poet and translator.
Mike Gregory, 65, English darts player.
Umang Gupta, 72, Indian-American entrepreneur, bladder cancer.
Ellen Hancock, 79, American technology executive (IBM, National Semiconductor Corporation, Apple Inc.).
Steven Heighton, 60, Canadian author and poet, cancer.
Gert Hekma, 70, Dutch anthropologist and sociologist.
Rolando Hinojosa-Smith, 93, American novelist, essayist and poet.
Mosharraf Hossain, 40, Bangladeshi cricketer (Dhaka Division, Khulna Tigers, national team), brain cancer.
Iqbal Muhammad Ali Khan, 64, Pakistani politician, MNA (since 2002), complications from heart surgery.
Bob Latz, 91, American politician, member of the Minnesota House of Representatives (1959–1962, 1963–1966).
Carlos Lucas, 91, Chilean boxer, Olympic bronze medallist (1956).
John McKay, 82, British-Canadian mathematician (McKay conjecture, McKay graph).
Ardina Moore, 91, American Quapaw-Osage fashion designer.
Pan Jiluan, 94, Chinese scientist, president of Nanchang University (1993–2002) and member of the Chinese Academy of Sciences.
Sandra Pisani, 63, Australian field hockey player, Olympic champion (1988), cancer.
Samiur Rahman, 68, Bangladeshi cricketer (national team), brain cancer.
Dede Robertson, 94, American evangelical Christian activist.
Henry Scott-Stokes, 83, British journalist (Financial Times, The Times, The New York Times).
Norman Surplus, 59, Northern Irish adventurer, first person to circumnavigate the world in an autogyro, cancer.
Kane Tanaka, 119, Japanese supercentenarian, world's oldest person (since 2018).
Freeman Williams, 65, American basketball player (San Diego Clippers, Atlanta Hawks, Utah Jazz).

20
Philip Beidler, 77, American writer.
Hilda Bernard, 101, Argentine actress (Rebelde Way, Floricienta).
Ivan Bidnyak, 36, Ukrainian sport shooter and soldier, shot.
Ian Brooks, 93, New Zealand politician, MP (1970–1975).
Gino Burrini, 87, Italian Olympic alpine skier (1956).
Alan Garen, 96, American geneticist.
Olle Goop, 78, Swedish trotting driver and trainer.
Guitar Shorty, 87, American blues guitarist.
Antonín Kachlík, 99, Czech film director (Já, truchlivý bůh, Princ Bajaja) and screenwriter.
Javier Lozano Barragán, 89, Mexican Roman Catholic cardinal, bishop of Zacatecas (1984–1997) and president of the Pastoral Care of Health Care Workers (1996–2009). 
Gavin Millar, 84, Scottish film director (Dreamchild, Danny, the Champion of the World, Complicity), critic and television presenter.
Read Morgan, 91, American actor (The Deputy, Gunsmoke, Back to the Future).
Robert Morse, 90, American actor (How to Succeed in Business Without Really Trying, Tru, Mad Men), Tony winner (1962, 1990)
T. Rama Rao, 83, Indian film director (Navaratri, Jeevana Tarangalu, Yeh To Kamaal Ho Gaya).
Vundela Malakonda Reddy, 89, Indian writer and poet.
Erwina Ryś-Ferens, 67, Polish four-time Olympic speed skater.
Enver Yulgushov, 83, Russian football player (Zenit Leningrad) and manager (Rostselmash Rostov-on-Don, Torpedo Taganrog).

21
Moslem Bahadori, 95, Iranian pathologist.
Elspeth Barker, 81, British novelist and journalist, complications from a stroke.
Carl Wayne Buntion, 78, American convicted murderer, execution by lethal injection.
Eric Chappell, 88, English screenwriter (The Squirrels, Rising Damp, Home to Roost).
Clive Collins, 80, British cartoonist and illustrator.
Ralph DeLoach, 65, American football player (New York Jets).
Volodymyr Denshchykov, 69, Ukrainian actor and artist.
John DiStaso, 68, American journalist (New Hampshire Union Leader, WMUR-TV).
David Friedland, 84, American politician and criminal, member of the New Jersey General Assembly (1966–1974) and Senate (1978–1980).
Ali Hamsa, 66, Malaysian civil servant, chief secretary to the government (2012–2018).
Renate Holm, 90, German-Austrian actress (The Count of Luxemburg) and operatic soprano (Vienna State Opera).
Sir Geoffrey Howlett, 92, British army general, commander-in-chief of the Allied Forces Northern Europe (1986–1989).
Huang Shuqin, 82, Chinese film director (A Soul Haunted by Painting, Sinful Debt).
Aydın İlter, 91, Turkish military officer, general commander of the Gendarmerie (1993–1995).
Mwai Kibaki, 90, Kenyan politician, president (2002–2013), vice president (1978–1988) and MP (1974–2013).
Daryle Lamonica, 80, American football player (Oakland Raiders, Buffalo Bills, Southern California Sun).
Iván Markó, 75, Hungarian dancer and choreographer.
Frank Otway, 99, American basketball player (Chicago American Gears).
Jacques Perrin, 80, French actor (Z, Black and White in Color, The Sleeping Car Murders) and filmmaker.
Cynthia Plaster Caster, 74, American visual artist, cerebrovascular disease.
John Rutherford, 92, Australian cricketer (Western Australia, national team).
J. D. Rymbai, 87, Indian politician, chief minister of Meghalaya (2006–2007) and Meghalaya MLA (1983–1988, 1993–2008).
Kazumi Watanabe, 86, Japanese Olympic long-distance runner (1960, 1964).
Ronald J. Zlatoper, 80, American naval officer, U.S. Pacific Fleet commander (1994–1996).

22
Lamidi Adeyemi III, 83, Nigerian traditional ruler, Alaafin of Oyo (since 1970).
Marshall Arisman, 83, American illustrator, painter, and educator.
Dennis J. Gallagher, 82, American politician, member of the Colorado House of Representatives (1970–1974) and Senate (1974–1994).
Walter Gwenigale, 87, Liberian politician, minister of health and social welfare (2006–2015).
Guy Lafleur, 70, Canadian Hall of Fame ice hockey player (Montreal Canadiens, Quebec Nordiques, New York Rangers), five-time Stanley Cup champion, lung cancer.
Marcus Leatherdale, 69, Canadian photographer.
Curt Merz, 84, American football player (Dallas Texans/Kansas City Chiefs, Ottawa Rough Riders).
Ted Prappas, 66, American racing driver (CART), colon cancer.
Jan Rot, 64, Dutch singer, composer, and translator, colon cancer.
Michelle Suárez Bértora, 39, Uruguayan politician and trans activist, senator (2014–2017).
Pedrie Wannenburg, 41, South African rugby union player (Ulster, Oyonnax, national team), traffic collision.
Clayton Weishuhn, 62, American football player (New England Patriots, Green Bay Packers), traffic collision.
Håkan Winberg, 90, Swedish politician, MP (1971–1982) and minister for justice (1979–1981).
Viktor Zvyahintsev, 71, Ukrainian footballer (Shakhtar Donetsk), Olympic bronze medallist (1976).

23
Arno, 72, Belgian singer (TC Matic) and actor (Camping Cosmos), pancreatic cancer.
Carmelo Borobia, 82, Spanish Roman Catholic prelate, bishop of Tarazona (1996–2004), auxiliary bishop of Toledo (2004–2010) and Zaragoza (1990–1996).
Nse Ekpenyong, 58, Nigerian politician, member of the House of Representatives (since 2015).
Justin Green, 76, American cartoonist (Binky Brown Meets the Holy Virgin Mary).
Enoch Kelly Haney, 81, American sculptor, painter, and politician, member of the Oklahoma House of Representatives (1980–1986) and Senate (1986–2002), chief of the Seminole Nation of Oklahoma (2005–2009).
Orrin Hatch, 88, American politician, senator (1977–2019) and president pro tempore of the U.S. Senate (2015–2019), complications from a stroke.
Fuad El-Hibri, 64, German-American businessman and philanthropist, founder of Emergent BioSolutions.
Philip J. Hilts, 74, American journalist and author, complications from liver disease.
Johnnie Jones, 102, American soldier, civil rights lawyer and politician, member of the Louisiana House of Representatives (1972–1976).
Milenko Kovačević, 58, Serbian footballer (Mačva Šabac, Rad, Apollon Athens).
Sheldon Krimsky, 80, American bioethicist.
Li Sanli, 86, Chinese engineer, member of the Chinese Academy of Engineering.
Adrian Long, 80–81, Northern Irish civil engineer.
Mike Sommer, 87, American football player (Washington Redskins, Baltimore Colts, Oakland Raiders).
John Paul, 71, Indian screenwriter (Yathra, Sandhya Mayangum Neram, Kattathe Kilikkoodu), kidney disease.
R. William Riggs, 83, American jurist, associate judge of the Oregon Supreme Court (1998–2006), complications from heart disease.
Barbara Sansoni, 94, Sri Lankan artist, designer and writer (Barefoot).
John Stofa, 79, American football player (Miami Dolphins, Cincinnati Bengals).
Kenneth E. Stumpf, 77, American soldier, Medal of Honor recipient.
Sheila Vaughan, 80, English amateur golfer.
Dawie de Villiers, 81, South African rugby union player (Western Province, Boland Cavaliers, national team), cancer.
Robert J. Warren, 88, American scientist and inventor.

24
James Bama, 95, American artist and book cover illustrator (Doc Savage).
Yvonne Blenkinsop, 83, English fishing safety campaigner.
Frances Cherry, 84, New Zealand novelist.
McCrae Dowless, 66, American political campaigner and convicted fraudster, lung cancer.
Freddy Hall, 37, Bermudian footballer (Telford United, Limerick, national team), traffic collision.
Dimpal Kumari Jha, 42, Nepalese politician, MP (2013–2017) and Madhesh Province MPA (since 2018), colon cancer.
Denis Kiwanuka Lote, 84, Ugandan Roman Catholic prelate, bishop of Kotido (1991–2007) and archbishop of Tororo (2007–2014).
Kaushalya Madushani, 26, Sri Lankan hurdler, suicide by hanging.
Sir Laurence Martin, 93, British academic.
Josep Massot, 80, Spanish Roman Catholic monk, historian, and philologist.
Kathy Mills, 86, Australian indigenous community leader and artist.
Binapani Mohanty, 85, Indian novelist.
Richie Moran, 85, American Hall of Fame lacrosse player and coach (Cornell Big Red).
Willi Resetarits, 73, Austrian singer, comedian, and human rights activist, fall.
K. Sankaranarayanan, 89, Indian politician, governor of Nagaland (2007–2008), Jharkhand (2009–2010) and Maharashtra (2010–2014), complications from a stroke.
Ronald R. Van Stockum, 105, British-born American military officer.
Rajesh Verma, 40, Indian cricketer (Mumbai), cardiac arrest.
M. Vijayan, 80, Indian structural biologist, president of the National Science Academy (2007–2010).
Collin Williams, 60, Zimbabwean cricketer (Matabeleland).
Quency Williams, 61, American football player (Calgary Stampeders, Winnipeg Blue Bombers), heart attack.
Francis Wilson, 82, South African economist.
Andrew Woolfolk, 71, American Hall of Fame saxophonist (Earth, Wind & Fire).

25
Hannes Adomeit, 79, German political scientist.
Edward J. Bronson, 91, American political scientist.
Marc G. Caron, 75, Canadian-born American biologist.
Mohammad-Ali Eslami Nodooshan, 97, Iranian literary critic, translator and poet.
Alabo Graham-Douglas, 82, Nigerian politician, minister of aviation (1990–1992), labour (1999–2000) and culture (2000–2001).
Bente Hansen, 82, Danish writer and women's rights activist.
Susan Jacks, 73, Canadian singer-songwriter (The Poppy Family) and record producer, kidney disease.
Kostas Karapatis, 94, Greek football player (Olympiacos, national team) and manager (Doxa Drama).
Bob LaRose, 76, Canadian football player (Winnipeg Blue Bombers) and coach (Western Mustangs), heart attack.
Ursula Lehr, 91, German gerontologist and politician, minister of family affairs (1989–1991) and MP (1990–1994).
Hossein Mollaghasemi, 89, Iranian Olympic wrestler (1960, 1964).
Morton Mower, 89, American cardiologist, cancer.
Salvatore Pica, 83, Italian art collector, COVID-19.
Mike Preaseau, 86, American college basketball player (San Francisco Dons).
Rha Woong-bae, 87, South Korean politician, minister of finance (1982) and deputy prime minister (1988).
J. Roy Rowland, 96, American politician, member of the U.S. House of Representatives (1983–1995) and Georgia House of Representatives (1976–1982).
Jimmy Thomas, 83, American soul singer (Kings of Rhythm), respiratory failure.
Henny Vrienten, 73, Dutch singer-songwriter and composer (Doe Maar).
Geraldine Weiss, 96, American investor.
Corey Wittenberg, 60, American-born Australian tennis player.
Shane Yellowbird, 42, Canadian country singer.

26
Peter Ackerman, 75, American businessman, founder of Americans Elect and the International Center on Nonviolent Conflict.
Luke Allen, 43, American baseball player (Los Angeles Dodgers, Colorado Rockies).
Richard Beaumont, 60, British actor (Scrooge).
Inge Bernstein, 91, Austrian-born English judge.
Elvera Britto, 81, Indian field hockey player (national team).
Jack Cakebread, 92, American winemaker, founder of Cakebread Cellars.
Julie Daraîche, 83, Canadian singer.
Ann Davies, 87, English actress (Doctor Who, Peter's Friends, The Sculptress).
Daniel Dolan, 70, American Catholic sedevacantist bishop (since 1993).
George D. Gould, 94, American financier and banker, under secretary of the Treasury (1985–1988).
İsmail Ogan, 89, Turkish wrestler, Olympic champion (1964), multiple organ failure.
Klaus Schulze, 74, German electronic musician (Tangerine Dream, Ash Ra Tempel, The Cosmic Jokers) and composer. 
Peter Vickery, 72, Australian lawyer, judge of the Supreme Court of Victoria (2008–2018), cancer.

27
Carlos Amigo Vallejo, 87, Spanish Roman Catholic cardinal, archbishop of Seville (1982–2009) and Tanger (1973–1982), heart failure.
LeRoy Armstrong, 85, Canadian politician, New Brunswick MLA (1995–1999, 2003–2006).
David Birney, 83, American actor (St. Elsewhere, Bridget Loves Bernie, Oh, God! Book II) and stage director, complications from Alzheimer's disease.
Shahzada Mohiuddin, 83, Pakistani politician, MNA (1985–1988) and minister of excise and taxation (1990).
Nagaenthran K. Dharmalingam, 33, Malaysian drug trafficker, execution by hanging.
Bob Elkins, 89, American actor (Coal Miner's Daughter, The Dream Catcher).
Carlos García Cambón, 73, Argentine footballer (Chacarita Juniors, Boca Juniors, Unión de Santa Fe), complications from ruptured abdominal aneurysm.
John Gwitira, 72, Zimbabwean political activist, chairman of the National Liberation War Veterans Association (1989–1997).
Judy Henske, 85, American folk singer ("High Flying Bird").
Nikolai Leonov, 93, Russian KGB officer and politician, deputy (2003–2007).
Adam Lepa, 83, Polish Roman Catholic prelate and theologian, auxiliary bishop of Łódź (1988–2014).
Liao Guoxun, 59, Chinese politician, delegate to the NPC (2008–2013, since 2017) and mayor of Tianjin (since 2020).
Kristian Lundberg, 56, Swedish author.
Maria L. Marcus, 88, Austrian-born American lawyer.
Jack Morris, 90, American football player (Los Angeles Rams, Pittsburgh Steelers, Minnesota Vikings).
Shirley Nelson, 96, American author.
Rich Pahls, 78, American politician, member of the Nebraska Legislature (2005–2013, since 2021) and Omaha City Council (2013–2021), complications from cancer.
Bernard Pons, 95, French politician, four-time deputy, minister of transport (1995–1997), and Paris councillor (1983–2008).
Bryan Saunders, 69, Canadian Olympic sprinter (1976, 1984).
Victor Serrano, 78, French rugby league player (Saint-Gaudens Bears, national team).
Kenneth Tsang, 86, Hong Kong actor (A Better Tomorrow, The Killer, Once a Thief).
David Walden, 79, American computer scientist (IMP, ARPANET), lymphoma.

28
Neal Adams, 80, American comic book artist (Batman, Superman vs. Muhammad Ali, Green Lantern), complications from sepsis.
John Bosley, 74, Canadian politician, MP (1979–1993) and speaker of the House of Commons (1984–1986), heart failure.
Tanya Brady, 49, British rower, equestrian accident.
Peter Brandt, 90, British Olympic rower (1952).
Juan Diego, 79, Spanish actor (The Dumbfounded King, Go Away from Me, Los hombres de Paco).
Jean-Claude Fruteau, 74, French politician, deputy (2007–2017), MEP (1999–2007), and mayor of Saint-Benoît, Réunion (since 2008).
Salim Ghouse, 70, Indian actor (Subah, Bharat Ek Khoj, Wagle Ki Duniya).
Vira Hyrych, 54, Ukrainian journalist and radio producer (Radio Free Europe/Radio Liberty), missile strike.
Harold James, 79, American politician, member of the Pennsylvania House of Representatives (1989–2008, 2012–2013).
Harold Livingston, 97, American novelist and screenwriter (Star Trek: The Motion Picture, The Hell with Heroes).
M. A. Mannan, 72, Bangladeshi politician, MP (1991–1995) and mayor of Gazipur (1991–1996, 2013–2018).
Hugh McDevitt, 91, American immunologist.
Steve McMillan, 80, American politician, member of the Alabama House of Representatives (since 1980), brain cancer.
Susan Nussbaum, 68, American actress and disability rights activist, complications from pneumonia.
Ian Pool, 85, New Zealand demographer.
Charles T. Prewitt, 89, American mineralogist and solid state chemist.
Fernando Sáenz Lacalle, 89, Spanish Roman Catholic prelate, archbishop of San Salvador (1995–2008).
Zoran Sretenović, 57, Serbian basketball player (Crvena zvezda, Jugoplastika) and coach (Železničar Inđija), European champion (1991, 1995), heart attack.
Mendes Thame, 75, Brazilian politician, deputy (1987–1993, 1999–2019) and mayor of Piracicaba (1993–1997).
Larry Woiwode, 80, American writer.

29
Erich Barnes, 86, American football player (Chicago Bears, New York Giants, Cleveland Browns).
Joanna Barnes, 87, American actress (Auntie Mame, Tarzan, the Ape Man, The Parent Trap) and writer.
Georgia Benkart, 74, American mathematician, lung cancer.
Allen Blairman, 81, American jazz drummer.
Maria Antònia Canals, 91, Spanish mathematician and pedagogist.
Choijinzhab, 91, Chinese linguist.
John Cooke, 77–78, Irish judge.
David A. Evans, 81, American chemist.
Robert Goolrick, 73, American writer, complications from COVID-19.
Clive Griffiths, 67, Welsh footballer (Kansas City Comets, Chicago Sting, Tranmere Rovers).
Ahmad Rithauddeen Ismail, 94, Malaysian politician, MP (1969–1990), minister of defence (1987–1990) and foreign affairs (1975–1981, 1984–1986), stroke.
Roberto Lecaros, 77, Chilean jazz musician and composer.
Andrew G. McBride, 61, American attorney.
Peter Moore, 78, American shoe designer (Nike, Inc.).
Walter Rossi, 74, Italian-Canadian guitarist (Influence, Luke & The Apostles), lung cancer.
Tarsame Singh Saini, 54, British singer.
Ivan Snehota, 75–76, Czechoslovakian-born Italian organizational theorist. (death announced on this date)
Nader Talebzadeh, 68, Iranian film director (The Messiah), heart failure.
George Yanok, 83, American television writer and producer (Hee Haw, Welcome Back, Kotter, The Stockard Channing Show), Emmy winner (1974, 1976), lung cancer.

30
Allister Adel, 45, American lawyer, county attorney of Maricopa County, Arizona (2019–2022).
Ricardo Alarcón, 84, Cuban politician, minister of foreign affairs (1992–1993) and president of the National Assembly of People's Power (1993–2013).
Frank J. Anderson, 83–84, American police officer,  sheriff of Marion County, Indiana (2003–2011).
Lee Brayton, 88, American racing driver and engine builder.
Neil Campbell, 45, English footballer (Doncaster Rovers, Scarborough, Barrow).
DJ Delete, 30, Australian DJ and music producer, overdose.
Ray Fenwick, 75, English guitarist (The Spencer Davis Group, Ian Gillan Band).
Ron Galella, 91, American paparazzo, heart failure.
Marthe Gautier, 96, French physician.
*Khun Htun Oo, 78, Burmese political activist.
Naomi Judd, 76, American Hall of Fame country singer (The Judds) and songwriter ("Change of Heart", "Love Can Build a Bridge"), suicide by gunshot.
Waqar Ahmad Khan, 54, Pakistani politician, MPA (since 2018), cardiac arrest.
Bob Krueger, 86, American diplomat and politician, member of the U.S. House of Representatives (1975–1979) and Senate (1993), ambassador to Botswana (1996–1999).
*Abul Maal Abdul Muhith, 88, Bangladeshi economist and politician, minister of finance (2009–2019) and MP (2009–2018).
Lyubov Panchenko, 84, Ukrainian visual artist and fashion designer, starvation.
Mino Raiola, 54, Italian football agent (Pavel Nedvěd, Paul Pogba, Zlatan Ibrahimović).
Max Riebl, 30, Australian countertenor, cancer.
Gabe Serbian, 44, American hardcore punk drummer and guitarist (The Locust, Dead Cross).
Ülo Tulik, 64, Estonian agronomist and politician, governor of Võru County (2005–2010).

References

2022-4
4